Shawclough & Healey railway station served the townships of Shawclough and Healey in Rochdale, in the Metropolitan Borough of Rochdale in Greater Manchester, England, from 1870 until closure in 1947.

References

Lost Railways of Lancashire by Gordon Suggitt

Disused railway stations in the Metropolitan Borough of Rochdale
Former Lancashire and Yorkshire Railway stations
Railway stations in Great Britain opened in 1870
Railway stations in Great Britain closed in 1947